Gran Maître is the primary creator god in Haitian Vodou. He is the equivalent of the Judeo-Christian God.

References

Haitian Vodou gods
Creator gods